The Reformed Ecumenical Council (REC) was an international organization of Calvinist churches. It had 39 member denominations from 25 countries in its membership, and those churches have about 12 million people together. It was founded August 14, 1946 in Grand Rapids, Michigan as the Reformed Ecumenical Synod. The Reformed Ecumenical Council was the second largest international Calvinist alliance and the more conservative of the two largest. In 1953, The Reformed Ecumenical Synod meeting in Edinburgh decided to advise its member churches not to join the World Council of Churches as currently constituted because it “permits essentially different interpretations of its doctrinal basis, and thus the nature of the Christian faith” and “represents itself as a Community of faith, but is actually not this” due to member churches holding “basically divergent positions.”
About two-thirds of REC member churches also belonged to the larger World Alliance of Reformed Churches (WARC). The seat of the Reformed Ecumenical Council was Grand Rapids, Michigan, United States.

After a two-day meeting ending on 1 February 2006, Douwe Visser, president of the REC and Clifton Kirkpatrick, president of the World Alliance of Reformed Churches, said in a joint letter to their constituencies, "We rejoice in the work of the Holy Spirit which we believe has led us to recommend that the time has come to bring together the work of the World Alliance of Reformed Churches and the Reformed Ecumenical Council into one body that will strengthen the unity and witness of Calvinist Christians." The new body would be called the World Communion of Reformed Churches.

Australia
Christian Reformed Churches of Australia

Botswana
Dutch Reformed Church in Botswana

Dominican Republic
Christian Reformed Church of the Dominican Republic

France
Evangelical Reformed Church of France (UNEPREF, formerly EREI)

Greece
Greek Evangelical Church

India
Presbyterian Church of India

Indonesia
Indonesian Christian Church of Central Java (GKI)
Javanese Christian Churches (GKJ)
Christian Church of Sumba (GKS)
Southernpart Sumatra Christian Church (GKSBS)
Church of Toraja Mamasa (GTM)
Toraja Church (GT)

Japan
Reformed Church in Japan

Kenya
The Reformed Church of East Africa

Korea
The Presbyterian General Assembly (Reformed Church of Korea)

Malawi
Church of Central Africa Presbyterian - Nkhoma Synod

Mexico
Associate Reformed Presbyterian Church of Mexico

Mozambique
Reformed Church in Mozambique

Myanmar
Christian Reformed Church in Myanmar

Netherlands
Protestant Church in the Netherlands (PKN)

Nigeria
Christian Reformed Church of Nigeria
Church of Christ in Nigeria
Church of Christ in the Sudan Among the Tiv (NKST)
Evangelical Reformed Church of Christ
Presbyterian Church of Nigeria

Philippines
Christian Reformed Church in the Philippines

South Africa
Dutch Reformed Church (NGK)
Dutch Reformed Church in Africa (DRCA)
Reformed Church in Africa
Nederduitsch Hervormde Kerk van Afrika (NHKA)

Sri Lanka
Dutch Reformed Church in Sri Lanka

Swaziland
Swaziland Reformed Church (SRC)

Uganda
Christian Reformed Church of East Africa
Reformed Presbyterian Church in Uganda

United States and Canada
Christian Reformed Church in North America

Notes

External links
 World Reformed Communion announcement

Christian organizations established in 1946
International bodies of Reformed denominations